POW is "prisoner of war", a person, whether civilian or combatant, who is held in custody by an enemy power during or immediately after an armed conflict.

POW or pow may also refer to:

Music 
 "P.O.W" (Bullet for My Valentine song) (2013)
 "Pow! (Forward)", a 2004 song by Lethal Bizzle
 "Pow", a song by the Beastie Boys from Check Your Head
 "P.O.W. (Pissed Off White Boy)", a 1993 song by Beowülf from Un-Sentimental
 "Pow", a song by Graham Central Station from My Radio Sure Sounds Good to Me
 "POW", a 2009 song by Soulja Boy from The DeAndre Way

Organizations
 POW! Entertainment, a media production company
 Polska Organizacja Wojskowa or Polish Military Organisation
 Protect Our Winters, a non-profit environmental organization
 Portorož Airport's IATA code

Television
 P.O.W. (United States Steel Hour)
 P.O.W. (TV series), a 2003 ITV mini-series
 "P.O.W." (The Flash), an episode of The Flash

Other uses
 P.O.W.: Prisoners of War, a 1988 arcade game that was ported to the NES console
 Pow (surname)
 pow function in C, the exponentiation function in the programming language C
 Powys, county in Wales, Chapman code POW
 Proof of work or PoW system
 P.O.W; aka Prince of Wales

See also 
 Pow! (disambiguation)
 Pow wow (disambiguation)
 Prisoner of War (disambiguation)